Thomas Robert Docking (August 10, 1954 – August 24, 2017) was an American politician. He was the 41st Lieutenant Governor of Kansas from 1983 to 1987. A lawyer, he was an alumnus of the University of Kansas.

His father, Robert Docking, and grandfather George Docking, both served as Governor of Kansas. Docking died from cancer on August 24, 2017.

References

1954 births
2017 deaths
Kansas Democrats
Lieutenant Governors of Kansas
Kansas lawyers
University of Kansas alumni
People from Lawrence, Kansas
Deaths from cancer in Kansas
Docking family
20th-century American lawyers